Alex Lee (24 March 1908 – 10 August 1996) was an Australian rules footballer who played for the Hawthorn Football Club in the Victorian Football League (VFL).

Lee's great-grandson, Josh Ward, was drafted to Hawthorn in the 2021 AFL draft.

Notes

External links 

1908 births
1996 deaths
Australian rules footballers from Victoria (Australia)
Hawthorn Football Club players
Horsham Football Club players